is a 1996 3D fighting arcade game developed by Racdym (now known as Racjin) and published by Atlus. It is both Atlus and Racdym's first attempt in the 3D fighting game market.

While in development, the game was known as "Ultimate Domain", and was intended to run on the Sega Model 2 hardware.

The game was ported to the PlayStation by Atlus, being released on December 13, 1996, in Japan. In October 1997, JVC Music Europe published it in Europe under the title Yusha: Heaven's Gate.

Reception 
German magazine Maniac gave it a score of 70/100.

French magazine Joypad gave it 75%.

References

External links
Heaven's Gate at The Large Cult Fighting Game March 
Heaven's Gate at Fighters Front Line 

Heaven's Gate at arcade-history

1996 video games
3D fighting games
Arcade video games
Atlus games
Multiplayer and single-player video games
PlayStation (console) games
Racjin games
Fighting games
Video games developed in Japan